Melanie Cremer (born 23 December 1970 in Düsseldorf) is a German former field hockey player who competed in the 1996 Summer Olympics.

References

External links
 

1970 births
Living people
German female field hockey players
Sportspeople from Düsseldorf
Olympic field hockey players of Germany
Field hockey players at the 1996 Summer Olympics